João Paulo Silva Pinho (born 30 April 1992 in Oliveira de Azeméis, Porto metropolitan area) is a Portuguese professional footballer who plays for Leça F.C. as a goalkeeper.

References

External links

National team data 

1992 births
Living people
People from Oliveira de Azeméis
Sportspeople from Aveiro District
Portuguese footballers
Association football goalkeepers
Liga Portugal 2 players
Campeonato de Portugal (league) players
U.D. Oliveirense players
F.C. Paços de Ferreira players
S.C. Freamunde players
GD Bragança players
Amarante F.C. players
Leça F.C. players
Portugal under-21 international footballers